Ngenechen (also known as Ngunechen, Nguenechen, Guenechen, Guinechen) is one of the most important Ngen spirits within traditional Mapuche religion; and is the most important deity in the present beliefs of the Mapuche people.

Ngenechen originally was only the Ngen spirit "governor of the Mapuche people" and not their creator god; but as a product of syncretism with Catholicism, Ngenechen is now also the "Supreme Being" in Mapuche religion, and is synonymous with the term God as used in Abrahamic religions.

References
 Leslie Ray. Language of the land: the Mapuche in Argentina and Chile. Volumen 119 de IWGIA document. International Work Group for Indigenous Affairs. IWGIA, 2007. , 
 Oscar Paillacan Ramirez, (Junio, 1999), Religión y Mitología Mapuche Ngenechen, centro de documentación mapuche. (Spanish)

See also
Antu

Ngen
Mapuche gods
Creator gods